Ransomware as a Service is a cybercrime business model where ransomware operators write software and affiliates pay to launch attacks using said software.

Affiliates do not need to have technical skills of their own but rely on the technical skills of the operators.

Microsoft Threat Intelligence Centre(MSTIC) regards RaaS as different from previous forms of ransomware as it no longer has a tight link between tools, initial entry vector and payload choices. They regard them as having a double threat - both encrypting data and exfiltrating it and threatening to publish it.

Examples of RaaS kits include Locky, Goliath, Shark, Stampado, Jokeroo and Encryptor.

References

Ransomware
Cybercrime